Têtes Raides is a French folk rock group.

Group history
The group was founded in Paris during the 1980s. Originally, they played music heavily influenced by the punk movement and depended on electric instruments. Their third album featured Anne-Gaëlle, a classically trained cellist, and marked a turning point in the group's music toward a more acoustic sound. The group's later efforts misleadingly take on the air of quotidian folk songs while actually using stunning musical arrangements, experimental soundscapes and poetic lyrics rife with very dark humor.

Listeners find the influence of classic French musicians like Jacques Brel, Georges Brassens and the Négresses Vertes in the later work.

Group members
 Christian Olivier : Voice, accordion, acoustic guitar, graphics
 Grégoire Simon (a.k.a. "Iso") : Saxophone, flute, accordion, voice
 Pascal Olivier (a.k.a. "Cali") : Bass guitar, double bass, Hélicon, tuba, voice (Christian's brother)
 Anne-Gaëlle Bisquay : Cello, violin
 Serge Bégout : Acoustic guitar, baritone saxophone
 Jean-Luc Millot (a.k.a. "Lulu") : drums, voice.
 Édith Bégout (a.k.a. "la p'tite dernière") : Tuba, baseball bat, piano (Serge's sister)

Discography
Studio albums

# : Vocals by Sara Mandiano.

Live albums

Compilation albums
2000: 10 ans de Têtes Raides 
2006: Aïe
2008: Best Of – 20 ans de Ginette (FR #70)

Videography
2003: Têtes Raides aux Bouffes du Nord (filmed live in 2002)
2008: Trash live au Bataclan (live filmé en novembre 2006), qu'on retrouve au sein de la compilation 20 ans de Ginette

References

Musical groups from Paris